The Nanushuk Group or Nanushuk formation is a geologic group in Alaska in westernmost National Petroleum Reserve in Alaska (NPR-A). Oil in these rocks likely was generated beneath Western North Slope and migrated northeastward into NPR-A. It preserves fossils dating back to the Cretaceous period. Underneath the Nanushuk lies the Torok Formation.

Geology
The Nanushuk Formation together with the Torok Formation below it forms a huge wedge of sediment deposited in a deep water basin and stretches from north of the Brooks Range beneath the Alaska North Slope to the adjacent offshore. It was deposited in shallow water and includes potential reservoirs in deltaic, shoreface, and fluvial sandstones. The USGS found large-scale folds and faults in the South of the formation and evidence, that the rocks have been heated to temperatures at which oil is converted to natural gas.

History
Before 2015, about 150 oil exploration wells had been drilled into the Nanushuk and Torok Formations, yet oil production had finding one small oil pool.

In 2015 the oil industry announced it had discovered the Pikka oil pool in the Nanushuk Formation and in 2017 an extension of Pikka oil at Horseshoe, 21 miles south, estimated together at more than 1,000 MMBO.In 2017, ConocoPhillips announced discovery of the Willow oil pool in the Nanushuk Formation with estimated resources of more than 300 MMBO.
As of 2017, the U.S. Geological Survey estimated that there were 8.7 billion barrels of oil and 25 trillion cubic feet of natural gas in the Nanushuk and Torok Formations, much more than previously estimated.

See also

 List of fossiliferous stratigraphic units in Alaska
 Paleontology in Alaska

References

Further reading
 

Cretaceous Alaska